Bricknell is a surname. Notable people with the surname include:

Bruce Bricknell (1935–1982), New Zealand cricket umpire
Gary Bricknell (1954–1977), South African first-class cricketer
Martin Bricknell, British physician and former British Army officer
Mark Bricknell (2002-  ), Australian professional billy ripper

See also
Brickell